The Free of the South Movement is a centre-left political party created in 2006 in Argentina. It is made up of the Movimiento Barrios de Pie, the Agrupación Martín Fierro, the Frente Barrial 19 de Diciembre and the Corriente Patria Libre.

History
In the 2007 Argentine general election, the movement had two of its members elected as national representatives in the Lower House of the Argentine National Congress, Cecilia Merchan and Victoria Donda, daughter of desaparecidos. They were elected on the lists of the ruling Front for Victory faction of the Justicialist Party and sit in the block of the Popular and Social Encounter.

See also
Politics of Argentina

References

External links
Official website of the Movimiento Libres del Sur
Official website of the Movimiento Barrios de Pie
Official website of the Movimiento Universitario Sur
Official website of the Instituto de Investigación Social, Económica y Política Cuidadana
Official website of Victoria Donda Pérez, national deputy of the Movimiento Libres del Sur 
Official website of Cecilia Merchán, national deputy of the Movimiento Libres del Sur

2006 establishments in Argentina
Political parties established in 2006
Progressive parties